Kenya competed at the 2018 Winter Olympics in Pyeongchang, South Korea, from 9 to 25 February 2018. The country returned to the Winter Olympics, after last competing in 2006. The Kenyan team consisted of one female alpine skier, the first woman to compete for the country at the Winter Olympics.

Background
Philip Boit, Kenya's only prior Winter Olympian, served as the chef de mission for the delegation to Pyeongchang.

Alpine skiing 

Kenya qualified one female athlete, Sabrina Simader. Simader was born in Kenya, and moved to Austria when she was three years old, where she picked up the sport. Simader also represented the country at the Winter Youth Olympics in 2016 in Lillehammer, Norway. Kenya will be making its debut in the sport at the Winter Olympics. Simader is aiming for a top 20 finish in her events.

See also
Kenya at the 2016 Winter Youth Olympics
Kenya at the 2018 Commonwealth Games

References

Nations at the 2018 Winter Olympics
2018
2018 in Kenyan sport